Following is a list of Russian presidential candidates by number of votes received, since the first Russian presidential election in 1991.

List

See also
 Russian presidential elections
 List of Russian presidential candidates

References